The Maple River is a  tributary of the Grand River in the central part of the Lower Peninsula of the U.S. state of Michigan. It rises in Shiawassee Township, Shiawassee County south of the city of Owosso. It flows west through Clinton, Gratiot and Ionia counties, flowing into the Grand River at Muir.  Other cities it flows through along the way include Ovid, Elsie and Maple Rapids.

There are 5 major dams along the river and its tributaries: Lake Victoria, Lake Ovid, Elsie, Rainbow and Hubbardston.  Portions of the river within Clinton, Gratiot, and Ionia counties are organized as the Maple River State Game Area.

References

External links
 Friends of the Maple River

Rivers of Ionia County, Michigan
Rivers of Gratiot County, Michigan
Rivers of Clinton County, Michigan
Rivers of Shiawassee County, Michigan
Rivers of Michigan
Tributaries of Lake Michigan